The Very Best Of 1990–1997 is a compilation album by Sweden-based Nigerian artist Dr. Alban released on 30 June 1997

Track listing 

"Hello Afrika"  
"Stop the Pollution" [Album Version]   
"U & Mi" [Album Version]   
"No Coke" 
"One Love" [Radio Version]  
"Sing Hallelujah"  
"It's My Life"   
"Look Who's Talking" [Long]  
"Let the Beat Go On" [Short] 
"Away from Home" [Short]  
"This Time I'm Free" [Credibility Mix]  
"Born in Africa"   
"It's My Life" [Sash Remix] 
"Sing Hallelujah" [DJ Stevie Steve's Pizzi Edit]  
"Hello AfriKa" ['97 Remix]   
"No Coke" [Klanghouse Remix]

Charts

References

1997 compilation albums
Dr. Alban compilation albums